Chantal Camara Nanaba is an Ivorian judge. In April 2019, she was made president of the Court of Cassation, joining the other three judges Pierre Kobo Claver, Koné Mamadou and Francis Wodié. In May 2020 she became president of the Superior Council of the Judiciary. President of the republic, Alassane Ouattara, appointed her to a term of three years. She has received the highest honour bestowed by the state, the National Order of the Ivory Coast.

References

Year of birth missing (living people)
Ivorian judges
Ivorian women